Darkness on the Edge of Town is a studio album released by Bruce Springsteen in 1978. 

Darkness on the Edge of Town may also refer to:

Music
 "Darkness on the Edge of Town" (song), the title song of Bruce Springsteen's Darkness on the Edge of Town album

Television 

 "Darkness on the Edge of Town" (Teenage Mutant Ninja Turtles), a 2003 episode of the TV series Teenage Mutant Ninja Turtles
 "Darkness on the Edge of Town" (One Tree Hill), a 2010 episode of the TV series One Tree Hill
 "Darkness on the Edge of Town" (Arrow), a 2013 episode of the TV series Arrow
 "Darkness on the Edge of Town" (Once Upon a Time), a 2015 episode of the TV series Once Upon a Time

Other uses 
Darkness on the Edge of Town Tour, a 1978 North American concert tour by Bruce Springsteen
Darkness on the Edge of Town, a 2014 novel written by Brian Keene
Stranger Things: Darkness on the Edge of Town, a 2019 novel written by Adam Christopher